Kenneth Browne may refer to:
 Kenneth Browne (painter), African-American painter
 Kenneth N. Browne (1923–2000), member of the New York State Assembly

See also
 Kenneth Brown (disambiguation)